Parevia unicolorata is a moth of the subfamily Arctiinae. It is found in Brazil.

References

Phaegopterina
Moths described in 1928